This is a list of songs that charted in the top ten of the ARIA Charts in 2022.

Top-ten singles 
An asterisk (*) represents that a single is in the top ten as of the issue dated March 6, 2023.

Key

2018 peaks

2020 peaks

2021 peaks

2023 peaks

See also 

 List of number-one singles of 2022 (Australia)

References 

Australia Singles Top 10
Top 10 singles
Top 10 singles 2022
Australia 2022